Chapar Khaneh may refer to:
 Chapar Khaneh, Gilan
 Chapar Khaneh Rural District, in Gilan Province